Prairiland High School is a public high school located in Pattonville, Texas that serves students in grades 9-12.  The school is part of the Prairiland Independent School District which encompasses the southeastern corner of Lamar County and western portions of Red River County. In 2013, the school was rated "Met Standard" by the Texas Education Agency.

Athletics
The Prairiland Patriots compete in the following sports:

Baseball
Basketball
Cross Country
Football
Golf
Powerlifting
Softball
Track and Field
Volleyball

State Titles
Volleyball - 
2001(2A)
Baseball - 
1986(3A)

State Finalists
Volleyball  
1994(2A), 2002(2A)

Achievements
Prairiland High produced the 2001-02 individual overall champion in the UIL Science academic competition.

Notable alumni 
Brenda Cherry, civil rights activist

References

Schools in Lamar County, Texas
Public high schools in Texas
Public middle schools in Texas